Watch the World may refer to:
 Watch the World (The Little Heroes album), an album by Australian band Little Heroes (band), (1983).
 "Watch the World (song)", taken from the Little Heroes album, Watch the World.
 "Watch the World", a song from the 2002 album Box Car Racer
 Watch the World, a 2016 album by Markus Schulz
Watch the World, a 1950-1951 magazine-style television documentary show on American network NBC hosted by John Cameron Swayze and Don Goddard.